Guo Cui (born 26 February 1975) is a Chinese former synchronized swimmer who competed in the 1996 Summer Olympics.

References

1975 births
Living people
Chinese synchronized swimmers
Olympic synchronized swimmers of China
Synchronized swimmers at the 1996 Summer Olympics
Synchronized swimmers from Shandong
Sportspeople from Jinan